Irakli Lomouri (born 12 April 1959) is a Georgian writer, translator and playwright.

Biography 
Lomouri born in 1959, Tbilisi, Georgia. In 1981 he graduated Tbilisi State University, faculty of Oriental studies; later he entered Tbilisi Theological Academy, majoring in Christian Anthropology. Afterwards, he worked as a teacher at various schools and as a journalist in various newspapers, published several Georgian stories, novels and plays. His plays were performed in Georgia at theaters, on television and on radio. Some of his works have been translated into English and Russian. His main works are An Incident and Auto-Obituary.

Books
 Gza (გზა), Ushba Publications Tbilisi, 2020
 Journey to Olympia, Olympic Committee Publishing, 2014
 What the Three World Religions Preach, Ustari Publishing House, 2013
 An Open Letter to Bidzina Ivanishvili or Rather to His Secretary, Intelekti Publishing, 2013 
 The Woman from Paris, Intelekti Publishing, 2013 
 Mamlakuda and Other Tales, Saunje Publishing House, 2013
 Auto-Obituary, Ustari Publishing House, 2012 
 The Chronicles of Parallel Georgia, Gumbati Publishing, 2011
 33 Rhyme Puzzles for Fun, Palitra L Publishing, 2009
 The Tiflis Stamp or Murder in the Family, Palitra L Publishing, 2008
 Murder in the Sexology Centre, Palitra L Publishing, 2007
 Belles-lettres Cactus, Parnasi Publishing, 2005
 Ex Libris, Publishing House Merani-Lomisi, 2003
 An Incident, Publishing House Lomisi, 1999

Translations
 Short stories by O. Henry, Tbilisi, Palitra L Publishing,  
 The Godfather by Mario Puzo, Tbilisi, Palitra L Publishing, 
 The Golden Notebook by Doris Lessing, Tbilisi, Palitra L Publishing,

Literary prizes and awards
 Winner of Literary Contest Lit Harvest 2012 for short story Jo(r)jo 
 Winner of National Radio Broadcasting contest 1988 for radio play In the Draw-Well

References

External links 
 Filmography
 Intelekti Publishing: Author IRAKLI LOMOURI

1959 births
Male writers from Georgia (country)
Writers from Tbilisi
Tbilisi State University alumni
Living people
Novelists from Georgia (country)
Dramatists and playwrights from Georgia (country)
Screenwriters from Georgia (country)
Translators from Georgia (country)
20th-century writers from Georgia (country)
21st-century writers from Georgia (country)
Postmodern writers
20th-century dramatists and playwrights from Georgia (country)
21st-century dramatists and playwrights from Georgia (country)